Fusong County is a county in southern Jilin province, China. The county contains the Changbaishan Airport, which opened on 3 August 2008, and is served by China National Highway 201.

Administrative divisions
There are 12 towns and six townships.

References

External links

Baishan
County-level divisions of Jilin
Fusong County